Leo Joachim Frachtenberg  (February 24, 1883 – November 26, 1930) was an anthropologist who studied Native American languages. Frachtenberg helped write the Handbook of American Indian Languages, BAE Bulletin 40, and also wrote "Alsea Texts and Myths", BAE Bulletin 67.

Early life and education
Frachtenberg was born to Abraham Frachtenberg and Jeanette (Rottenstreich) in Czernowtz, Austria, now a city in Ukraine, on February 24, 1883. He graduated from the Imperial Royal Gymnasium, Przemysl, Austria, now in Poland, in 1904.

After immigrating to the United States in 1904, Frachtenberg enrolled at Cornell University. He was awarded a Master of Arts from Columbia University in 1906 where his thesis was titled, Richard Wagner, his life and his works.

During his studies at Columbia, Frachtenberg became a student of Franz Boas, often called the father of American anthropology. Frachtenberg's research centered around some of the subdivisions of what later became the Penutian language group, and he received a PhD from Columbia in 1910 for his work on the Coosan languages.

Professional career
Frachtenberg lectured in anthropology at Columbia until 1912, and in 1913 he became a "Special Ethnologist" at the Smithsonian Institution's  Bureau of American Ethnology (BAE). While at BAE, he taught students at Chemawa Indian School in Salem, Oregon. From the school, he studied the ethnology of Alsea, Siletz, Quileute, Chimakum, and Shasta peoples with attention to art and religion.

In late 1917, after returning from Salem to Washington, D.C., Frachtenberg was abruptly fired from his job at BAE for making comments derogatory to the government of the United States, at a time of heightened nationalism and World War I.  Franz Boas tried to defend him, but the Secretary of the Smithsonian, Charles Walcott, dismissed him because he believed the comments  were "inimical to the public welfare." He did not, however, consider the comments disloyal, or treasonous.

Frachtenberg had immigrated from then Austria-Hungary, part of the Central Powers. Ironically, after his termination from BAE,  Frachtenberg joined the United States Army and attained the rank of lieutenant colonel by the time of his discharge in 1920.

Jewish welfare activities
After military service, Frachtenberg became general secretary of the Young Men's Hebrew Association in Troy, New York. He was also national field director of Keren Hayesod during the 1920s.

While conferring with Jewish leaders in Waterloo, Iowa, in 1930, Frachtenberg became ill. He died a few days later from pneumonia at the age of 47.

Published work
 Andrade, Manuel J.; & Frachtenberg, Leo J. (1931). Quileute texts. Columbia University contributions to anthropology (Vol. 12). New York: Columbia University Press.
 Bernstein, Jay H. (2002) "First Recipients of Anthropological Doctorates in the United States, 1891–1930" American Anthropologist 104 (2): 551-564
 Frachtenberg, Leo J. (1913). Coos texts. California University contributions to anthropology (Vol. 1). New York: Columbia University Press. (Reprinted 1969 New York: AMS Press).
 Frachtenberg, Leo J. (1914). Lower Umpqua texts and notes on the Kusan dialect. California University contributions to anthropology (Vol. 4, pp. 141–150). (Reprinted 1969, New York: AMS Press).
 Frachtenberg, Leo J. (1922). Coos: An illustrative sketch. In Handbook of American Indian languages (Vol. 2, pp. 297–299, 305). Bulletin, 40, pt. 2. Washington:Government Print Office (Smithsonian Institution, Bureau of American Ethnology).

References

Further reading

Penaloza-Patzak, Brooke. “Quiet Invader? Anthropologist Leo Frachtenberg and the Politics of Biting Your Tongue in Wartime America,” in Quiet Invaders Revisited: Biographies of Twentieth Century Immigrants to the United States. Transatlantica 11. Guenter Bischof (ed.). Innsbruck: Studien Verlag, 2018, 65-78.

External links
 Coos Texts, (1913) on Internet Sacred Text Archive

Columbia Graduate School of Arts and Sciences alumni
1883 births
1930 deaths
Linguists from the United States
Deaths from pneumonia in Iowa
Linguists of Siouan languages
Linguists of Penutian languages
20th-century American anthropologists
20th-century linguists